Till I Loved You is the twenty-fifth studio album by American singer Barbra Streisand, released on October 25, 1988 on Columbia Records. The album was particularly notable both for its thematic structure (its eleven songs chronicle a romance's beginning, middle and end) and its high-budget production, as many guest writers, producers and musicians participated during its making – Burt Bacharach and Carole Bayer Sager offered three brand new songs to the album, Quincy Jones produced "The Places You Find Love" and Luther Vandross and Dionne Warwick among others added backing vocals to the track. Also, the title track (a Top 40 hit in the Billboard Hot 100) was a duet between Streisand and her then-boyfriend, actor Don Johnson. According to the liner notes of Streisand's retrospective box set: Just for the Record, the album also received a record certification in the Netherlands and in New Zealand.

History
After two successful projects with The Broadway Album – Streisand's 1985 return to her stage roots – and One Voice – her first full-length live concert recorded in September 1986, which was issued on both disc and video with benefit purposes, she decided to make a return to the pop scene. Till I Loved You was conceived as a lushly romantic album, with a particular concept – it followed the stages of a relationship from the beginning (in songs like "The Places You Find Love") to the end ("Some Good Things Never Last"), and then wrapped up the theme with a positive song about the future ("One More Time Around").

Many writers, producers and musicians appeared on the album, making it a high-budget project as with Streisand's previous pop mainstream project, 1984's Emotion.

The opening song, "The Places You Find Love" was produced by Quincy Jones. Later, the song appeared on his own album Back on the Block, which received a Grammy Award for Album of the Year in 1991. Streisand's version features an all-star backup group - background vocals are credited to Luther Vandross, Dionne Warwick, James Ingram, Howard Hewett, Jennifer Holliday, Peggi Blu, Clif Magness, Siedah Garrett and Edie Lehmann. On Back on the Blocks version, Garrett sang the first verse and chorus, followed by Chaka Khan singing the second verse. Jones utilized the same arrangement and background singers for his album, and also incorporated some African chanting during the bridge and climax of the song. "The Places You Find Love" was the only time Streisand and Jones have worked together (until "We Are The World 25 (For Haiti)" in 2010).

The album's title track is a duet with the Miami Vice actor Don Johnson, whom Streisand was dating at the time of recording. The track was the love theme from Goya, a project developed by CBS Records, Freddie Gershon and Allan Carr for opera singer Plácido Domingo playing artist Francisco Goya. In 2006, in an interview with TV host Jonathan Ross, Johnson recalled about the recording of the song:

Burt Bacharach produced and wrote three tracks on Till I Loved You with his wife and lyricist Carole Bayer Sager. According to his own words, "Barbra has great range. Nobody sounds like her when she's up that high, with that kind of clarity and purity. You can tell right away it's her. You can't say that about many singers."

Phil Ramone produced the song "All I Ask of You", which was originally a duet in Andrew Lloyd Webber's musical The Phantom of the Opera. Ramone commented:

Critical reception

The album received mixed reviews from music critics. William Ruhlmann from AllMusic gave the album a mixed review and wrote that although the album "was a big-budget effort" it's "like a movie with a great star, great production values, and a mediocre script, so how much you liked it depended on how much you liked Streisand, and it sold to her fans only". Paul Grein from the Los Angeles Times gave the album a favorable review and elected "All I Ask of You" as the best song of the record. He also wrote that the album "marked improvement over “Emotion” in that Streisand is no longer trying to compete with singers half her age for the hearts and minds of the teen-agers who buy singles and watch MTV". People magazine gave the album an unfavorable review in which the author wrote that the best part of the record is "the sheer pleasure of hearing Streisand's voice" and some tunes like "All I Ask of You" and "Some Good Things Never Last" but concluded that "there are moments when it almost doesn't matter what she's singing; you just wish it would never end."

 Track listing

 Personnel 
Information taken from the album's liner notes.Streisand, Barbra.  “Till I Loved You”.  Columbia. 1988.

 Barbra Streisand – lead vocals
 Randy Kerber – keyboards (1), synthesizer programming (1), Fender Rhodes (4, 6), Yamaha DX7 (4, 6), acoustic piano (7, 10),  synthesizers (11)
 Larry Williams – keyboards (1), synthesizer programming (1)
 Rhett Lawrence – synthesizer programming (1)
 Robbie Buchanan – synthesizers (2, 7-10)
 Tom Ranier – synthesizers (2, 8)
 Randy Waldman – acoustic piano (2, 8), synthesizers (3, 5, 7, 9, 10), synthesizer programming (3), drum programming (3, 9), arrangements (3), rhythm arrangements (5, 9)
 Michael Boddicker – synthesizers (4, 6, 11)
 Burt Bacharach – arrangements (4, 6, 11), acoustic piano (6)
 Mark Radice – acoustic piano (10)
 Tom Keane – acoustic piano (11)
 Paul Jackson Jr. – guitar (1)
 Michael Landau – guitar (1)
 Jeff Baxter – guitar (3)
 Dann Huff – guitar (4, 6, 11), electric guitar (8), acoustic guitar (8)
 Michael Thompson – guitar (9)
 Louis Johnson – bass (1)
 Neil Stubenhaus – bass (4, 6, 7, 10, 11)
 John Robinson – drums (1, 7)
 Carlos Vega – drums (4, 6)
 Scott Cutler – drum programming (9), rhythm arrangements (9)
 Jeff Porcaro – drums (10)
 Paulinho da Costa – percussion (1, 5)
 Michael Fisher – percussion (3)
 Lenny Castro – percussion (4, 6, 11)
 David Boruff – saxophone (3, 9)
 Chuck Findley – trumpet solo (4)
 Glen Ballard – synthesizer arrangements (1)
 Jerry Hey – synthesizer arrangements (1)
 Quincy Jones – synthesizer arrangements (1)
 Clif Magness – synthesizer arrangements (1), backing vocals (1)
 Patrick Williams – string arrangements and conductor (2, 5, 8)
 Phil Ramone – arrangements (3)
 Jeremy Lubbock – string arrangements and conductor (7, 10), synthesizer arrangements (10)
 Peggi Blu – backing vocals (1)
 Siedah Garrett – backing vocals (1)
 Howard Hewett – backing vocals (1)
 Jennifer Holliday – backing vocals (1)
 James Ingram – backing vocals (1)
 Edie Lehman – backing vocals (1)
 Luther Vandross – backing vocals (1)
 Dionne Warwick – backing vocals (1)
 Don Johnson – lead vocals (3), backing vocals (9)
 Lynn Davis – backing vocals (6) 
 Denise De Caro – backing vocals (6) 
 Phillip Ingram – backing vocals (6)
 Joe Pizzulo – backing vocals (6)
 Andrea Robinson – backing vocals (6) 
 Howard Smith – backing vocals (6)

 Production 

 Quincy Jones – producer (1), tracking (1)
 Glen Ballard – associate producer (1), tracking (1)
 Clif Magness – associate producer (1), tracking (1)
 Barbra Streisand – producer (2, 7, 8, 10)
 Phil Ramone – producer (3, 5)
 Burt Bacharach – producer (4, 6, 11)
 Carole Bayer Sager – producer (4, 6, 11)
 Denny Diante – producer (7, 9, 10)
 John Arrias – recording (1, 2, 3, 5, 7-10), mixing (2, 3, 5, 7, 8)
 Humberto Gatica – recording (1)
 Bruce Swedien – recording (1), mixing (1)
 Jerry Hey – tracking (1)
 Frank Wolf – recording (2, 5, 8, 9, 10), mixing (5)
 Mick Guzauski – recording (4, 6, 11), mixing (4, 6, 9, 10, 11)
 Jim Scott – recording (9)
 Bryant Arnett – assistant engineer
 Mike Bosley – assistant engineer
 Frank Dookun – assistant engineer 
 Clark Germain – assistant engineer
 David Glover – assistant engineer
 Debbie Johnson – assistant engineer, production assistant 
 Laura Livingston – assistant engineer 
 Richard McKernan – assistant engineer
 Marnie Riley – assistant engineer
 Joe Schiff – assistant engineer
 Stephen Shelton – assistant engineer
 Brad Sundberg – assistant engineer
 Gary Wagner – assistant engineer
 Bernie Grundman – mastering 
 Susanne Marie Edgren – production coordinator 
 Kim Skalecki – production coordinator 
 Nancy Donald – art direction, design 
 Tony Lane – art direction, design 
 Randee St. Nicholas – photographyStudios'
 Recorded at B&J Studios, Cherokee Studios, Record Plant, Lion Share Recording and Westlake Audio (Los Angeles, CA); Conway Studios, Sunset Sound and Ocean Way Recording (Hollywood, CA): Zebra Studios (Studio City, CA).
 Mixed at Conway Studios and Westlake Audio.
 Mastered at Bernie Grundman Mastering (Hollywood, CA).

Charts

Weekly charts

Certifications and sales

References

1988 albums
Barbra Streisand albums
Albums produced by Quincy Jones
Albums produced by Phil Ramone
Albums produced by Burt Bacharach
Albums produced by Carole Bayer Sager
Columbia Records albums
Concept albums
Albums recorded at Sunset Sound Recorders